The Taipei Hakka Culture Hall is a cultural center in Da'an District, Taipei, Taiwan which acts as a center for cultural exchange between the Hakka community and Taipei residence.

History
The hall was established on 3 October 1998.

Features

The hall consists of lobby displaying traditional Hakka home. Other buildings usually host artistic and cultural exhibits, as well as stage traditional dancing and opera performances. The hall also has classrooms and meeting rooms used for other different functions.

Transportation
The cultural center is accessible within walking distance North West from Daan Station of Taipei Metro.

See also
 List of tourist attractions in Taiwan
 Taiwanese people

References

1998 establishments in Taiwan
Buildings and structures completed in 1998
Cultural centers in Taipei
Hakka culture in Taiwan